"Say Yeah" is a song by the American hard rock band Kiss. It was released on their nineteenth album Sonic Boom in 2009. It was released as a single on December 8, 2009. The song is the last featured on the album.
Kiss played the song for the first time October 26 in Atlanta, Georgia.

Background
Paul Stanley, the sole writer of the song, said about it: "It was a song I knew was going to be great... I knew what this song was and its turned out exactly the way I had hoped, and really better. The band has four great voices so when we do a chorus together it sounds like the world singing." The song is about how we shouldn't be wasting time and over-thinking things.

"Say Yeah" was announced December 5 to be the second single from  Sonic Boom and was officially released on December 8 but in Argentina it was released the second week of January 2010. Like Sonic Boom, the song was recorded at Conway Recording Studios in Hollywood, California. It was written by Paul Stanley and Gene Simmons.
After peaking #11 in its first week, "Say Yeah" topped the charts in Russia.

Live performances
"Say Yeah" was first performed on October 26, 2009 in Atlanta, Georgia during the North American leg in support of Sonic Boom on Kiss Alive/35 World Tour.

Personnel
Paul Stanley – lead vocals, rhythm guitar
Gene Simmons – bass, backing vocals
Tommy Thayer – lead guitar, backing vocals
Eric Singer – drums, backing vocals

Charts

References

Kiss (band) songs
2009 singles
Songs written by Paul Stanley
Songs written by Gene Simmons
2009 songs
Roadrunner Records singles